The 2008 Man Booker Prize was awarded at a ceremony on 14 October 2008. The Prize was awarded to Aravind Adiga for The White Tiger.

Judges
Michael Portillo (Chair)
Alex Clark
Louise Doughty
James Heneage
Hardeep Singh Kohli

Shortlist

Longlist

Sources
 2008 Man Booker Prize

Man Booker
Booker Prizes by year
2008 awards in the United Kingdom